The 2017–18 Chennaiyin FC season was the club's fourth season since its establishment in 2014 and their fourth season in the Indian Super League.

Transfers

Pre-season

In:

Out:

Squad

Technical staff

Competitions

Indian Super League

League table

Results summary

Results by round

Matches

League stage

Playoffs

Final

Indian Super Cup

As one of the top six teams in Indian Super League, Chennaiyin FC  qualified for the main round in 2018 Indian Super Cup. Chennaiyin FC  will meet the fifth placed I-League side Aizawl F.C. in Round of 16 match.

Squad statistics

Appearances and goals

|-
|colspan="14"|Players who left Chennaiyin due to injury during the season:
|}

Goal scorers

Clean sheets

Disciplinary record

Notes

References

Chennaiyin FC seasons
Chennaiyin